The Indo-Iranian languages (also Indo-Iranic languages or Aryan languages) constitute the largest and southeasternmost extant branch of the Indo-European language family. They include over 300 languages, spoken by around  1.5 billion speakers, predominantly in South Asia, the Middle East and parts of Central Asia.

The common ancestor of all of the languages in this family is called Proto-Indo-Iranian—also known as Common Aryan—which was spoken in approximately the late 3rd millennium BC. The three branches of the modern Indo-Iranian languages are Indo-Aryan, Iranian, and Nuristani. A fourth independent branch, Dardic, was previously posited, but recent scholarship in general places Dardic languages as archaic members of the Indo-Aryan branch.

The areas with Indo-Iranian languages stretch from Europe (Romani) and the Caucasus (Ossetian, Tat and Talysh), down to Mesopotamia (Kurdish languages, Zaza–Gorani and Kurmanji Dialect continuum) and Persia (Persian), eastward to Xinjiang (Sarikoli) and Assam (Assamese), and south to Sri Lanka (Sinhala) and the Maldives (Maldivian), with branches stretching as far out as Oceania and the Caribbean for Fiji Hindi and Caribbean Hindustani respectively. Furthermore, there are large diaspora communities of Indo-Iranian speakers in northwestern Europe (the United Kingdom), North America (United States, Canada), Australia, South Africa, and the Persian Gulf Region (United Arab Emirates, Saudi Arabia).

The number of distinct languages listed in Ethnologue are 312, while those recognised in Glottolog are 320.

References

Further reading

 Baly, Joseph. Eur-Aryan roots: With their English derivatives and the corresponding words in the cognate languages compared and systematically arranged. Vol. 1. K. Paul, Trench, Trubner & Company, Limited, 1897.
 Chakrabarti, Byomkes (1994). A comparative study of Santali and Bengali. Calcutta: K.P. Bagchi & Co. 
 Kümmel, Martin Joachim. "The morphology of Indo-Iranian". In: Handbook of Comparative and Historical Indo-European Linguistics. Volume 3. Edited by Jared Klein, Brian Joseph and Matthias Fritz. Berlin, Boston: De Gruyter Mouton, 2018. pp. 1888-1924. https://doi.org/10.1515/9783110542431-032
 Kümmel, Martin Joachim. “Indo-Iranian”. In: The Indo-European Language Family: A Phylogenetic Perspective. Edited by Thomas Olander. Cambridge: Cambridge University Press, 2022. pp. 246–68. .
 Lubotsky, Alexander. "The phonology of Proto-Indo-Iranian". In: Handbook of Comparative and Historical Indo-European Linguistics. Volume 3. Edited by Jared Klein, Brian Joseph and Matthias Fritz. Berlin, Boston: De Gruyter Mouton, 2018. pp. 1875-1888. https://doi.org/10.1515/9783110542431-031
 Pinault, Georges-Jean. "Contacts religieux et culturels des Indo-Iraniens avec la civilisation de l'Oxus". In: Comptes rendus des séances de l'Académie des Inscriptions et Belles-Lettres, 149e année, N. 1, 2005. pp. 213–257. DOI:https://doi.org/10.3406/crai.2005.22848 ; www.persee.fr/doc/crai_0065-0536_2005_num_149_1_22848
 Pinault, Georges-Jean. "La langue des Scythes et le nom des Arimaspes". In: Comptes rendus des séances de l'Académie des Inscriptions et Belles-Lettres, 152e année, N. 1, 2008. pp. 105–138. DOI:https://doi.org/10.3406/crai.2008.92104 ; www.persee.fr/doc/crai_0065-0536_2008_num_152_1_92104

External links

 Swadesh lists of Indo-Iranian basic vocabulary words (from Wiktionary's Swadesh-list appendix)

 
Indo-European